Leandro Donizete Gonçalves da Silva (born 18 May 1982), known as Leandro Donizete, is a Brazilian footballer who plays as a defensive midfielder.

Club career

Ferroviária
Born in Araraquara, São Paulo, Donizete started his career in hometown club Ferroviária, making his senior debut in 2003. He subsequently became an undisputed starter for the side, helping in their promotion from Campeonato Paulista Série B1 in 2004 and in their Copa Paulista title in 2006.

Donizete left Ferroviária in the end of the 2007 season, with 141 matches and eight goals.

Coritiba
In January 2008, Donizete signed for Série A club Coritiba. He made his debut for the club on 13 February, starting in a 0–0 Copa do Brasil away draw against Tuna Luso.

Donizete scored his first goal for Coxa on 17 February 2008, netting the game's only in a home success over Cianorte for the Campeonato Paranaense championship. He made his debut in the main category of Brazilian football on 1 June, coming on as a half-time substitute in a 1–1 home draw against Cruzeiro.

Donizete soon established himself as a first-choice, and completed his 100th match for the club on 28 February 2010 in a 4–1 home routing of Nacional-PR. The following 29 January, he signed a new three-year contract.

Donizete's 150th match came on 10 April 2011, in a 1–0 home win against Corinthians-PR.

Atlético Mineiro
On 14 December 2011, Donizete signed a three-year deal with Atlético Mineiro, also in the first division; Coritiba also retained 70% of his federative rights and Renan Oliveira moved to the opposite direction on loan. He made his debut for the club the following 29 January, starting in a 2–0 Campeonato Mineiro home win against Boa Esporte.

Donizete immediately became a regular starter at Galo, being an important defensive unit during the club's 2013 Copa Libertadores winning campaign. On 9 December 2014, he renewed his contract for two further years.

Donizete scored his first Série A goal on 19 June 2016, netting the first in a 3–0 home win against Ponte Preta; he also assisted Carlos in the last goal. He ended his spell at the club with 231 matches and four goals.

Santos
On 28 December 2016, Donizete agreed to a three-year contract with fellow top tier club Santos after the expiration of his contract with Atlético. He made his debut for the club on 12 February, starting in the place of injured Renato in a 3–2 Campeonato Paulista away win against Red Bull Brasil.

On 11 April 2018, after being rarely used, Donizete was loaned to fellow top tier club América Mineiro until December. After a knee injury, América decided to renew his loan until the end of his treatment.

Career statistics

Honours

Club
Ferroviária
Copa Paulista: 2006

Coritiba
Campeonato Brasileiro Série B: 2010
Campeonato Paranaense: 2008, 2010, 2011

Atlético Mineiro
Campeonato Mineiro: 2012, 2013, 2015
Copa Libertadores: 2013
Recopa Sudamericana: 2014
Copa do Brasil: 2014

Individual
Campeonato Mineiro Team of the year: 2012, 2015

References

External links

1982 births
Living people
People from Araraquara
Brazilian footballers
Association football midfielders
Campeonato Brasileiro Série A players
Campeonato Brasileiro Série B players
Associação Ferroviária de Esportes players
Coritiba Foot Ball Club players
Clube Atlético Mineiro players
Santos FC players
América Futebol Clube (MG) players
Footballers from São Paulo (state)